Ich komm' nie mehr von dir los is the second German single recorded by U. S. entertainer Connie Francis.

The song is the German cover version of Francis' U. S. recording "Many Tears Ago", of which she recorded 4 versions in total:

English
German 
Italian (as Piangere per te mai più)
Spanish (as Dime que paso)

After Francis' German debut single Die Liebe ist ein seltsames Spiel had peaked sensationally at # 1 on the Munich charts, Ich komm' nie mehr von dir los scored a rather disappointing chart position by peaking only at # 35.
 
The B-side of Ich komm' nie mehr von dir los was Singin' the Blues, an English recording from her 1959 album Country & Western – Golden Hits.

References

1960 singles
Connie Francis songs
Songs written by Winfield Scott (songwriter)
1960 songs
MGM Records singles